Hugo Villa (July 26, 1886 - November 4, 1948) was an American sculptor, born in Turin, Italy, and active at Mount Rushmore, working for Gutzon Borglum, and in Texas in his own studio. Before turning to sculpture, he was a violin maker who studied under Albert Moglie and completed two violins. He is buried in the San Jose Burial Park, San Antonio, Texas.

Selected works 
 Texas Memorial to Honored Dead, 1931 (Austin, Texas)
 The Evolution of a Great State, 1938 (Austin, Texas)
 German Pioneers of Texas Monument, 1938 (New Braunfels, Texas)

References 
 A Comprehensive Guide to Outdoor Sculpture in Texas, Carol Morris Little, University of Texas Press, 1996, page 83. .
 Smithsonian Institution SIRIS records
 CultureNOW article
 German Pioneers of Texas Monument (Waymarking)
 
 Amati record
 Information from a relative

American sculptors